The 2013 Women's World Junior Team Squash Championships was held in Wroclaw, Poland. The event takes place from 22 to 27 July 2013.

Seeds

Group stage results

Pool A

Pool B

Pool C

Pool D

Finals

Draw

Results

Semi-finals

Final

Post-tournament team ranking

See also
2013 Women's World Junior Squash Championships
World Junior Squash Championships

References

External links 
hastalavista.pl/wjc-2013/strona-glowna-2?lang=en World Junior Squash Championships 2013 Official Website
World Junior Squash Championships 2013 SquashSite Website

Wom
Squash tournaments in Poland
2013 in Polish women's sport
2013 in women's squash
World Junior Squash Championships
International sports competitions hosted by Poland